Boomerang Family (lit. "Aging Family") is a 2013 South Korean comedy-drama film directed by Song Hae-sung, and starring Park Hae-il, Yoon Je-moon, Gong Hyo-jin, Youn Yuh-jung, and Jin Ji-hee. Based on the 2010 novel Aging Family by Cheon Myeong-kwan, the film is about three misfit siblings in their thirties and forties who all decide to move back in with their mother.

Plot
Film director In-mo (Park Hae-il) is a 40-year-old movie director who's been jobless for the past decade after his debut film was a commercial and artistic flop. Mired in poverty and depressed at his wife's affair, he decides to hang himself. But a well-timed call from his mother (Youn Yuh-jung) inviting him to dinner results in a change of plans. Instead of killing himself, he decides to move into his mother's home, where his older brother Han-mo (Yoon Je-moon) also lives. A 44-year-old unemployed ex-gangster with five criminal convictions, Han-mo is not particularly pleased at this development. But more trouble lies ahead: younger sister Mi-yeon (Gong Hyo-jin) arrives with her bratty, rebellious 15-year-old daughter Min-kyung (Jin Ji-hee). 35-year-old Mi-yeon announces that she is leaving her second husband, and that she needs to stay with them for the immediate future. Thus the dysfunctional family is reunited, revealing petty conflicts, sibling rivalries and largely unexpressed affection, as they struggle with the challenges of middle age.

Cast
 Park Hae-il as Oh In-mo
 Yoon Je-moon as Oh Han-mo
 Gong Hyo-jin as Oh Mi-yeon
 Youn Yuh-jung as Mom
 Jin Ji-hee as Shin Min-kyung, Mi-yeon's daughter
 Ye Ji-won as Han Soo-ja, hairdresser
 Kim Young-jae as Jung Geun-bae, Mi-yeon's boyfriend
 Yoo Seung-mok as drug peddler
 Park Young-seo as Ki-soo, Han-mo's thief friend
 Lee Young-jin as Seo Mi-ok, In-mo's wife 
 Jung Young-gi as Jang, Mi-yeon's husband
 Kim Hae-gon as Kim, porno producer
 Kim Dae-jin as Choi
 Yoo Yeon-mi as Min-kyung's school friend
 Han Sung-yong as restaurant customer
 Oh Min-ae as landlady
 Woo Hye-jin as Mi-yeon's wedding friend
 Hwang Byung-gook as wedding photographer
 Park Geun-hyung as Mr. Gu, Mom's male friend
 Kim Ji-young as Sang-geun's woman
 Yang Hee-kyung as Jung-hyun's woman
 Kim Kyung-ae as Jung-bok's woman

Awards and nominations
2013 50th Grand Bell Awards
Nomination - Best Director - Song Hae-sung
Nomination - Best Actress - Youn Yuh-jung
Nomination - Best Supporting Actress - Jin Ji-hee

References

External links
  
 
 
 

2013 films
2013 comedy-drama films
South Korean comedy-drama films
Films based on South Korean novels
Films directed by Song Hae-sung
CJ Entertainment films
2010s Korean-language films
2010s South Korean films